Ramin in Iran may refer to:
 Ramin, Khuzestan
 Ramin, Tehran
 Ramin, Zanjan